The coat of arms of Lubusz Voivodeship, Poland, features an Iberian style escutcheon divided vertically onto two sides, of which, the left side has red background, with left side of a white (silver) eagle, with yellow (golden) crown, legs, a ring on its tail, and a przepaska on its wing, while the right side, has green background with two yellow (golden) six-pointed stars, placed vertically. It was established in 2000.

Design 
The coat of arms is an Iberian style escutcheon divided vertically onto two sides. The left side consists of red background, with a left half of the white (silver) eagle, with yellow (golden) crown, legs, a ring on its tail, and a przepaska on its wing, in the form of thin upwards curved bar ended with trillium-like shape. The right side had green background with two yellow (golden) six-pointed stars, placed vertically.

The white (silver) eagle on the red background has been based on the coat of arms of Poland, and symbolizes the alliance of the voivodeship to that country. The green colour symbolizes the forests that cover around half of the region, while 2 stars symbolize the two seats cities of the voivodeship: Zielona Góra, and Gorzów Wielkopolski.

History 

Prior to establishment of the Lubusz Voivodeship, within its current borders, from 1975 to 1998, existed the Zielona Góra Voivodeship. It had adopted its coat of arms on 18 July 1985. The coat of arms had a red Norman style escutcheon with square top and acute base. Inside the shield was featured a white (silver) eagle with elevated wings, and a green figure in a shape of the borders of the voivodeship, with two blue rivers featured on it: Oder and Lusatian Neisse.

The Lubusz Voivodeship was established in 1998. Its coat of arms was adopted by the Lubusz Regional Assembly, on 26 June 2000 with the resolution no. XVIII/114/2000. The flag and the coat of arms were designed by Wojciech Strzyżewski. The coat of arms is additionally present in the centre of the state flag of the voivodeship.

See also 
 flag of the Lubusz Voivodeship

References 

Lubusz Voivodeship
Lubusz Voivodeship
Lubusz Voivodeship
2000 establishments in Poland
Lubusz Voivodeship
Lubusz Voivodeship
Lubusz Voivodeship